The men's team table tennis event was part of the table tennis programme at the 2020 Summer Olympics in Tokyo. The event took place from 1 August to 6 August 2021 at Tokyo Metropolitan Gymnasium.

Format
Teams were made up of three players. Each team match was made up of five individual matches and ended when either side has won three matches. The order of a team match was changed as follows: a doubles match, two singles matches, and if neither side had won three matches by this point, a maximum of two extra singles matches were played. The new order avoids any players playing two matches in succession, and forces players who play two singles to compete in the second individual match.

Qualification

Schedule

Seeds 
The men’s team Olympic qualification rankings published in July 2021 was used for seeding purposes. The results of the draw are announced on 21 July at the Tokyo Metropolitan Gymnasium. Each team is eligible to nominate one reserve player to the Tokyo Games to replace a team member who is injured or has an illness.

Bracket

Results

First round

Quarterfinals

Semifinals

Bronze medal match

Gold medal match

References

External links
 Results Books : Tokyo 2020. The Tokyo Organising Committee of the Olympic and Paralympic Games. (2021).
 Tokyo 2020 Olympic Games. ITTF
 2020 Summer Olympics / Table Tennis / Team, Men. Olympedia.org

Men's team
Men's events at the 2020 Summer Olympics